John II (21 March 1492 – 18 May 1557) was the Count Palatine of Simmern from 1509 until 1557.

John II was born in Simmern in 1492 as the eldest surviving son of John I, Count Palatine of Simmern. In 1508 he married Beatrix of Baden, daughter of Margrave Christoph I. He succeeded his father in 1509. John II allowed printing to be established in Simmern and was a patron of sculpture. He introduced the Reformation into Simmern which led to increased tensions with his neighbours, the Archbishoprics of Trier and Mainz.

Children
With Beatrix of Baden:
Katherine (27 March 1510 – 22 March 1572) Abbess in the Kumbd monastery
Joanna (1 July 1512 – 2 February 1581) Abbess in the Marienberg monastery near Boppard
Ottilie (4 November 1513 – 6 September 1553) Nun in Marienberg near Boppard
Frederick III (14 February 1515 – 26 October 1576)
Brigitte (18 August 1516 – 13 April 1562) Abbess of Neuburg monastery
Georg (20 February 1518 – 17 May 1569)
Elizabeth (13 February 1520 – 18 February 1564)
Reichard (25 July 1521 – 13 January 1598)
Maria (29 April 1524 – 29 May 1576)
William (24 July 1526 – 9 March 1527)
Sabina (13 June 1528 – 19 June 1578): married to Lamoral, Count of Egmont
Helena (13 June 1532 – 5 February 1579)

References

House of Wittelsbach
1492 births
1557 deaths